Phil or Philip Clark may refer to:
 Philip Lindsey Clark (1889–1977), English sculptor
 Philip Clark (rugby union) (1898–1985), American rugby union player
 Phil Clark (pitcher) (1931–2018), American baseball player
 Philip T. Clark (1935–1968), automotive designer
 Phil Clark (American football) (born 1945), American football player
 Phil Clark (outfielder) (born 1968), American baseball player
 Philip Clark (cricketer) (born 1979), former English cricketer
 Phil Clark (director), theatre director and writer
 Philip J. Clark (1920–1964), American ecologist and zoologist

See also
 Philip Clarke (disambiguation)